Henchir-El-Djemel, is a village of North Africa, near Sakiet Ezzit in the Gouvernorat of Safaqis, in Tunisia.

Geography
Henchir-El-Djemel is located at  34°53'50" N and 10°46'51" E  just north of Sfax. It is situated on a wadi, 7 km from the Mediterranean coast with an elevation of 57 meters above sea level.  Hennchir el Djemel is also known as Hanshīr al Jamal, and Henchir el Jemel.

History
Henchir-El-Djemel was the site of a Roman civitas in Africa Proconsulare. It was a Catholic diocese called Vicus Turris. The area is today arid but supports commercial agriculture.

References

 
Populated places in Sfax Governorate
Communes of Tunisia
Cities in Tunisia